Joeri Fransen (born 10 July 1981) is the winner of Idool 2004, the Belgian version of Pop Idol.

Idol performances 
 Semi-Finals (group 1): "Lean On Me" (Bill Withers)
 Top 10: "If I Had A Rocket Launcher" (Bruce Cockburn)
 Top 9: "All Night Long" (Lionel Richie)
 Top 8: "Geen Toeval" (Marco Borsato)
 Top 7: "Everybody's Talking" (Harry Nilsson)
 Top 6: "Lovin Whiskey" (Rory Block)
 Top 5: "Feeling Good" (Nina Simone)
 Top 4: "Black" (Pearl Jam)
 Top 4: "Clocks" (Coldplay)
 Top 3: "Wicked Game" (Chris Isaak)
 Top 3: "Out of Time" (Chris Farlowe)
 Top 2: "Ya Bout To Find Out" (winner's single)
 Top 2: "Everybody's Talking" (reprise) (Harry Nilsson)
 Top 2: "Georgia on My Mind" (Ray Charles)

Discography 
 "Ya Bout To Find Out" (Debut Single)
 "Ya Bout To Find Out"
 "Everybody's Talking"
 "Georgia on My Mind"
 "Ya Bout To Find Out" (instrumental)

 "High and Alive"
 "High and Alive"
 "If I Had A Rocket Launcher"

 True Lies (Debut Album)
 "Song For You"
 "If I Had A Rocket Launcher"
 "High and Alive"
 "You Gotta Learn"
 "Once A Man"
 "Scratch The Surface"
 "Here's To You"
 "True Lies"
 "Personality"
 "Brave Heart"
 "Ya Bout To Find Out"
 "We Came This Far"
 "Hold On to a Dream"

 "We Came This Far"
 "We Came This Far"
 "Stephanie Says"

 "True Lies" (single)
 "True Lies"

References 

1981 births
Living people
Idols (TV series) winners
Belgian pop singers
21st-century Belgian singers